Steven A. Shapiro is a retired U.S. Army general officer who specializes in logistics and sustainment. Major General Shapiro was commanding general of the United States Army Sustainment Command from 2019 to 2020. Prior to that, he was the commanding general of 21st Theater Sustainment Command in Germany with responsibility for military sustainment throughout the European and Africa theaters.

Education
Shapiro received a bachelors degree from George Washington University in 1985, a masters degree from Florida Institute of Technology in 1994 and a second masters degree from the Army War College.

Career
In August 2007, Shapiro took command of Letterkenny Army Depot in Franklin County, Pennsylvania. While he was base commander, construction of a new a new reserve center was added providing "real-world" training opportunities for the soldiers. While he was base commander, Letterkenny Army Depot won its fourth Shingo Prize for manufacturing.

Awards and decorations

His awards and badges include:
Distinguished Service Medal
Defense Superior Service Medal
Legion of Merit (with three Oak Leaf Clusters)
Bronze Star Medal (with two Oak Leaf Clusters) 
Defense Meritorious Service Medal 
Meritorious Service Medal (with three Oak Leaf Clusters)
Army Commendation Medal (with four Oak Leaf Clusters) 
Army Achievement Medal (with one Oak Leaf Cluster)  
Parachutist Badge

References

Year of birth missing (living people)
Living people
United States Army generals
United States Army War College alumni
Florida Institute of Technology alumni
George Washington University alumni
Recipients of the Defense Superior Service Medal
Recipients of the Legion of Merit